Freehay is a small village located 2 miles from the centre of Cheadle in Staffordshire, England. 

The village centre is at the main Freehay Bank (or Church Bank), properly known as School Lane. St Chad's C of E church is located here.(Designed by Gilbert Scott) Half a mile up the road from here near the crossroads is the 'Queens at Freehay' a very popular Pub-Restaurant and previously a small village shop, which ceased business in 2017. There is also a viewing platform to look out across Croxden Quarry. Turning right at the crossroads from the village centre the road continues to the other half of the village and then on towards Winnothdale. Despite having two quarries in the vicinity the village is very peaceful as there is no noise from the quarries and they are surrounded by trees.

At one time, Freehay was a larger village with its own school and Vicar; however, it is now a small peaceful village, without a school and shares a Rector with the nearby town of Cheadle. Some of the former houses were demolished to make way for Freehay Quarry. The former school, next door to the church, has been converted into a large house and the former vicarage is now a privately owned house. The village hall is located on School Lane next door to St Chad's school house. It is owned by the people of Freehay and managed by a committee of volunteers.

See also
Listed buildings in Cheadle, Staffordshire

Villages in Staffordshire